Events from the year 1808 in Denmark.

Incumbents
 Monarch – Christian VII (until 13 March), Frederick VI (starting 13 March)
 Prime minister – Christian Günther von Bernstorff

Events
 2 March – Action of 2, a naval battle between the British 18-gun Brig-sloop , and the Danish 28-gun Danish brig of war Admiral Yawl
Peter Willemoes are among the Danish casualties.
 9 June – The Battle of Saltholm

Undated

Births
 3 January – Jørgen Roed, painter (died 1888)
 25 September – Erling Eckersberg, engraver (died 1889)
 6 October – Frederick VII, king of Denmark (died 1863)

Deaths
 16 January – John Brown, merchant and ship-owner (born 1723) 
 7 February – Ove Høegh-Guldberg, statesman, historian, and de facto prime minister of Denmark  (born 1731)
 3 March –  Johan Christian Fabricius, zoologist (born 1745)
 13 March – Christian VII, king of Denmark (born 1749)
 22 March – Peter Willemoes, naval officer (born 1783)
 3 April – Daniel Adzer, medallist (born 1732)

References

 
1800s in Denmark
Denmark
Years of the 19th century in Denmark